Margarita Gasparyan was the defending champion, but chose not to participate.

Ivana Jorović won the title, defeating Pauline Parmentier in the final, 6–1, 4–6, 6–4.

Seeds

Main draw

Finals

Top half

Bottom half

References 
 Main draw

Engie Open de Seine-et-Marne - Singles